Prioneris philonome, the redspot sawtooth, is a butterfly in the family Pieridae.It was described by Jean Baptiste Boisduval in 1836. It is found in  the Indomalayan realm.

Subspecies
Prioneris philonome philonome (eastern Java)
Prioneris philonome vollenhovii Wallace, 1867 (Borneo)
Prioneris philonome themana Fruhstorfer, 1903 (Peninsular Malaysia, Sumatra)

References

External links
 Prioneris at Markku Savela's Lepidoptera and Some Other Life Forms

Prioneris
Butterflies described in 1836